Anna Skoda was a Bohemian luger who competed in the early 1910s. She won a gold medal in the women's singles event at the European Championships of 1914 in Reichenberg, Bohemia (now Liberec, Czech Republic).

References
https://web.archive.org/web/20110718204018/http://bsd-portal.de/index.php?id=381&cHash=0e8470ad29&tx_ttnews[tt_news]=1241 List of European Luge champions: 1914–53.  - accessed 8 February 2010.

Czechoslovak female lugers
Year of birth missing
Year of death missing